The 2021 IIHF Women's World Championship was an international ice hockey tournament organized by the International Ice Hockey Federation (IIHF), which was contested in Calgary, Alberta, from 20 to 31 August 2021, at WinSport Arena. It was originally scheduled to be contested in Halifax and Truro, Nova Scotia, Canada. It was the 20th edition of the IIHF Women's World Championship Top Division tournament.

No divisional promotion and relegation occurred after the Top Division tournament and both Division I tournaments in 2020 were cancelled due to the COVID-19 pandemic. Originally scheduled from 7 to 17 April, the tournament was postponed to 6 to 16 May 2021 on 4 March. On 21 April 2021, the Province of Nova Scotia informed Hockey Canada and the IIHF that the tournament had been cancelled at the recommendation of Premier Iain Rankin "due to concerns over safety risks associated with COVID-19."

The IIHF and Hockey Canada released a joint statement pledging to explore all avenues for hosting the event in a different Canadian city during the summer of 2021. IIHF President René Fasel emphasized, "This does not mean that we will not have a Women's World Championship in 2021. We owe it to every single player that was looking forward to getting back on the ice after such a difficult year that we do everything possible to ensure this tournament can be moved to new dates and played this year." On 30 April 2021, the IIHF announced that the tournament would take place between 20 and 31 August 2021. On 2 June 2021, the venue was identified as WinSport Arena at Canada Olympic Park in Calgary.

The tournament was played behind closed doors.

Canada won the tournament for the eleventh time after defeating the United States in the final. Finland captured bronze, by winning against Switzerland.

Participants

 – Promoted from Division I A

 – Promoted from Division I A

1

1 Pursuant to a December 2020 ruling by the Court of Arbitration for Sport on doping sanctions, Russian athletes and teams are prohibited from competing under the Russian flag or using the Russian national anthem at any Olympic Games or world championships through 16 December 2022, and must compete as "neutral athlete[s]." For IIHF tournaments, the Russian team will use the logo of the Russian Olympic Committee (ROC) and play under the name "ROC".

Rosters

Each team's roster must comprised a minimum of fifteen skaters (forwards and defencemen) and two goaltenders, and "due to the special situation with the COVID-19 pandemic and safety rules including no players being allowed to join late, the roster size for the tournament was exceptionally increased [from the standard 20 skaters and 3 goaltenders] to 25 players." All ten participating nations, through the confirmation of their respective national associations, were required to submit a "Long List" roster no later than two weeks before the start of the tournament. Final rosters will be submitted on 20 August 2021, one day before the tournament begins, but as no players can be added after arriving in Canada, rosters were effectively set when teams landed in Calgary on 11 August 2021.

Match officials
Twelve referees and ten linesmen were selected for the tournament.

Preliminary round
All times are local (UTC−6).

Group A

Group B

Knockout stage

Bracket
There was a re-seeding after the quarterfinals.

Quarterfinals

5–8th place placement games

Semifinals

Fifth place game

Third place game

Final

Final standings

Awards and statistics

Awards

Best player selected by the Directorate

All-Star team

Scoring leaders
List shows the top skaters sorted by points, then goals.

GP = Games played; G = Goals; A = Assists; Pts = Points; +/− = Plus/minus; PIM = Penalties in minutes; POS = Position
Source: IIHF

Leading goaltenders
Only the top five goaltenders, based on save percentage, who have played at least 40% of their team's minutes, are included in this list.

TOI = Time on ice (minutes:seconds); SA = Shots against; GA = Goals against; GAA = Goals against average; Sv% = Save percentage; SO = Shutouts
Source: IIHF

References

External links
Official website

IIHF Women's World Championship
2021 IIHF Women's World Championship
IIHF Women's World Championship
IIHF Women's
IIHF
2021 in Alberta